Warren Church may refer to:

Churches
Warren Congregational Church, Warren, Connecticut, listed on the National Register of Historic Places (NRHP)
Warren First Congregational Church-Federated Church, Warren, Massachusetts, NRHP-listed
Warren United Methodist Church and Parsonage, Warren, Rhode Island, NRHP-listed

Person
Warren Church (politician)